Little Ann Little (born Ann L. Rothschild, March 1, 1902 – October 22, 1981) was an American vaudevillian, voice actress and singer who gained fame in the 1930s as the voice of Betty Boop, taking over the voice from original portrayer Margie Hines. From 1931 to 1933, Little Ann Little made recordings for the "Betty Boop" cartoons and tour and appeared in variety shows throughout the country. Rothschild got the job as the voice of Betty Boop as the result of a contest held by Paramount Pictures for a girl with a squeaky voice.  She was also well suited for the role physically, being only four foot ten and weighing 100 pounds.

Little went on the road with the Fleischer Studios artist Pauline Comanor. Ann would pose while Pauline drew her as Betty Boop. They both finished the act with a "boop-boop-a-doop."

Little had started in show business in 1925 as a member of the pony chorus with the Greenwich Village Follies. She was also an RKO discovery and at one time had her own program on the NBC network as singer Little Ann Little.

Personal life
After her show business career was finished, Little moved to St. Petersburg, Florida with her husband, who was a retired employee of Consolidated Edison. In the late 1940s, she was an instructor at the Pauline Buhner School of Dance there, where she taught acting, singing and dancing.

Little studied the Bible, with the goal of becoming an ordained minister and to preach the Gospel. From 1954, Little was ordained as minister in the Unity Church of Christianity.

Little died at the age of 79 in Fort Myers, Florida on October 22, 1981.

References

External links
 
 Chunkymonkey.com Pauline Comanor's website
 Little Ann Rothschild - Is There a Doctor in the House?

Actresses from New York (state)
American film actresses
American voice actresses
Fleischer Studios people
Vaudeville performers
20th-century births
1981 deaths
20th-century American actresses